Bougre may refer to:

Places
Bougré, a village in central Burkina Faso
Bougre De Zoaga, a town in south-eastern Burkina Faso 
Bougre De Youga, a town in south-eastern Burkina Faso 
Literature
Histoire de Dom Bougre, Portier des Chartreux, French novel from 1741
Terms
Bougre, French for Bulgarian people
Bougre, etymological root for bugger
Bougres, a name for adherents of Catharism